Naomi Koshi  is a Japanese lawyer and advocate for gender equality and retired politician. In 2012 she became the youngest woman elected mayor of a Japanese city as the Mayor of Ōtsu, Shiga Prefecture for two four-year terms from January 2012 to January 2020.

Early life and education 
As a child, Koshi was inspired to become a politician when her mother had to leave her job for 10 years to take care of Koshi's grandmother. The mother had no assistance from the government.

Koshi graduated from Shiga Prefectural Zeze High School and received her undergraduate degree in law from Hokkaido University. In 2000, Koshi passed the bar exam and became a lawyer at Nishimura & Asahi. Koshi also worked as an adjunct professor at Waseda University in 2005.

In 2009, Koshi received a master's degree in international law from Harvard Law School. Her thesis was titled Takeover Defense in Japan. She then passed the New York State bar exam and worked for Debevoise & Plimpton LLP. Koshi was a visiting fellow at Columbia University's Center on Japanese Economy and Business from September 2010 until January 2011, while undergoing traineeship at the United Nations' legal department.

Mayorship 
In 2012 Koshi was elected mayor of Ōtsu, Shiga Prefecture, Japan. She is the youngest woman to be elected as mayor of a city in Japan. During her time in office Koshi has advocated for gender equality measures that would make it easier for women to stay in the workforce after having children, such as improving access to childcare and parental leave.

In 2015 Koshi was selected as a Young Global Leader by the World Economic Forum.

In November 2019, Koshi announced that she would not seek reelection as Otsu mayor for a third term. She also stated that she had no intention to seek another political office.

Selected bibliography

References

External links 
 Mayor Koshi Naomi Official website in Japanese こし直美公式Webサイト
 

Living people
1975 births
People from Shiga Prefecture
Hokkaido University alumni
Harvard University alumni
Columbia University people
Women mayors of places in Japan
Japanese women lawyers
21st-century Japanese lawyers